{{DISPLAYTITLE:C13H11N}}
The molecular formula C13H11N (molar mass: 181.238 g/mol) may refer to:

 Benzophenone imine, an organic compound with the formula of (C6H5)2C=NH
 2-Aminofluorene, a synthetic arylamine

Molecular formulas